Song Jialei (born 25 January 1995) is a Chinese handball player who plays for the club Beijing Handball. She is member of the Chinese national team. She competed at the 2015 World Women's Handball Championship in Denmark.

References

1995 births
Living people
Chinese female handball players